Comisión Clasificadora de Riesgo (CCR) (Risk Rating Commission, RRC) is a Chilean organization which was established in 1985 with the incorporation of Chilean Decree Law Nº 3500 for approving or rejecting domestic and foreign debt instruments and equity securities that can be purchased by Pension Funds.  Its risk rating system on equity securities is adopted by some of the International Social Security Association members.

References

External links
 Comisión Clasificadora de Riesgo

Business in Chile
1985 establishments in Chile
Organizations established in 1985
Credit rating agencies
1985 in Chilean law